Alexander Aristides Reid (born 21 July 1975) is an English former mixed martial artist (MMA), fighting under Bellator, BAMMA and Cage Rage. He is an actor, having been in Hollyoaks also making an appearance in Drifters. Reid was the winner of Channel 4's 7th and final series of Celebrity Big Brother in 2010.

Early life
Reid was born in Aldershot, Hampshire, where he attended the Connaught School. His father was a paratrooper and his mother was a homemaker. He is the youngest of six siblings.

Career

Acting

Reid played Jason Cunliffe in the Channel 4 soap-opera Hollyoaks in 2001. He appeared in the comedy series My Hero in 2002.  He also appeared in the TV Series Drifters (2016), as himself.

Mixed martial arts
Reid first got into martial arts at 14 and subsequently turned to mixed martial arts: "It was just a natural progression. I started off doing Kung Fu, Karate-style tournaments before moving on to Boxing, Kickboxing, a little bit of Judo, Jiu-Jitsu. MMA was a natural progression for a young lad wanting to find the latest and best style. It's just the most efficient and effective blend of martial arts really." He participated in mixed martial arts promotions Cage Rage, BAMMA and UCMMA and made his professional mixed martial arts debut in 2000.

Between 2004 and 2007, Reid appeared in the Cage Rage Championships. During this period, he achieved a record of 8 wins and 2 losses. On 22 September 2007, Reid faced Matt Ewin for the Cage Rage British Middleweight Championship at Cage Rage 23: Unbelievable, where he completed to fight until full time in which lost by a few points.

Return to mixed martial arts 
On 15 May 2010, Reid was scheduled to return to the cage professionally for the first time since 2007 to face Tom "Kong" Watson for the vacant BAMMA Middleweight Championship at BAMMA 3. However, Reid injured his knee while filming his documentary TV series Alex Reid: The Fight of His Life and was forced to pull out of the Reid-Watson fight and he was replaced by Matt Horwich. The pair rescheduled to meet at BAMMA 4

On 14 May 2011, Reid announced his retirement from MMA at an UCMMA 20 event in London. However, he did not rule out a return to the sport in future. His retirement was short lived, as he accepted a challenge from Jason Barrett at UCMMA 22. During the weigh-ins the day prior to the 2011 fight, both men weighed in at just under the 13 st 3 lb mark, being 13 st 2 lb and 13 st 1 lb respectively. On 6 August, Reid defeated Jason Barrett, via triangle choke in the first round, marking his first win in 6 years in MMA. On 16 July 2016, Reid made his return to MMA for the first time in nearly four years.

Celebrity Big Brother
On 3 January 2010, Reid became one of twelve housemates in Channel 4's 7th and final series of Celebrity Big Brother. Reid managed to win over the public and on 29 January he won the show with 65% of the vote beating the bookies favourites Dane Bowers and Vinnie Jones to be awarded most successful Celebrity Big Brother winner by public vote.

Personal life
Reid began dating English media personality Katie Price in July 2009, thus becoming embroiled in intense tabloid publicity in Britain following Price's divorce from Peter Andre, her first husband. In February 2010, Reid and Price married in Las Vegas.  Price announced they had separated in January 2011.

Reid later began dating glamour model and fellow Celebrity Big Brother winner Chantelle Houghton. On 17 June 2012, Houghton gave birth to a daughter, Dolly Reid. The couple separated in October 2012.

In 2020 Reid opened a fitness centre.

In April 2021, Reid was sentenced to eight weeks, half of which to be served in prison, for contempt of court after making a false statement in a claim for compensation after a car crash.

Mixed martial arts record

|-
| Loss
| align=center| 10–10–1 (1)
| Manuel Garcia
| Decision (unanimous)
| Bellator 158
| 
| align=center| 3
| align=center| 5:00
| London, England
| 
|-
| Win
| align=center| 10–9–1 (1)
| Sam Boo
| Decision (unanimous)
| BAMMA 11
| 
| align=center| 3
| align=center| 5:00
| Birmingham, England
| 
|-
| Win
| align=center| 9–9–1 (1)
| Jason Barrett
| Submission (triangle choke)
| UCMMA 22: Warrior Creed
| 
| align=center| 1
| align=center| 2:19
| London, England
|
|-
| Loss
| align=center| 8–9–1 (1)
| Tom Watson
| Decision (unanimous)
| BAMMA 4
| 
| align=center| 5
| align=center| 5:00
| Birmingham, England
| 
|-
| Loss
| align=center| 8–8–1 (1)
| Matt Ewin
| Decision (unanimous)
| Cage Rage 23
| 
| align=center| 3
| align=center| 5:00
| London, England
| 
|-
| Loss
| align=center| 8–7–1 (1)
| Murilo Rua
| TKO (doctor stoppage)
| Cage Rage 21
| 
| align=center| 1
| align=center| 0:28
| London, England
| 
|-
| Loss
| align=center| 8–6–1 (1)
| Xavier Foupa-Pokam
| Decision (unanimous)
| Cage Rage 19
| 
| align=center| 2
| align=center| 5:00
| London, England
| 
|-
| Loss
| align=center| 8–5–1 (1)
| Tony Fryklund
| Submission (heel hook)
| Cage Rage 18
| 
| align=center| 1
| align=center| 1:32
| London, England
| 
|-
| Loss
| align=center| 8–4–1 (1)
| Dave Menne
| Decision (unanimous)
| Cage Rage 16
| 
| align=center| 3
| align=center| 5:00
| London, England
| 
|-
| Loss
| align=center| 8–3–1 (1)
| Jason Tan
| Decision (split)
| WCFC: No Guts No Glory
| 
| align=center| 3
| align=center| 5:00
| Manchester, England
| 
|-
| Draw
| align=center| 8–2–1 (1)
| Daijiro Matsui
| Draw (majority)
| Cage Rage 14
| 
| align=center| 3
| align=center| 5:00
| London, England
| 
|-
| Win
| align=center| 8–2 (1)
| Kyosuke Sasaki
| TKO (doctor stoppage)
| Cage Rage 12
| 
| align=center| 1
| align=center| 5:00
| London, England
| 
|-
| Loss
| align=center| 7–2 (1)
| Jorge Rivera
| KO (strikes)
| Cage Rage 10
| 
| align=center| 1
| align=center| 0:41
| London, England
| 
|-
| Win
| align=center| 7–1 (1)
| Tulio Palhares
| Submission (triangle choke)
| Cage Rage 9
| 
| align=center| 1
| align=center| 1:17
| London, England
| 
|-
| Loss
| align=center| 6–1 (1)
| Mark Weir
| TKO (doctor stoppage)
| Extreme Brawl 6
| 
| align=center| 2
| align=center| N/A
| Bracknell, England
| 
|-
| Win
| align=center| 6–0 (1)
| Jean-François Lénogue
| Submission (triangle choke)
| Extreme Brawl 5
| 
| align=center| 1
| align=center| N/A
| Bracknell, England
| 
|-
| Win
| align=center| 5–0 (1)
| Mark Day
| TKO (strikes)
| Extreme Brawl 2
| 
| align=center| 2
| align=center| N/A
| Bracknell, England
| 
|-
| Win
| align=center| 4–0 (1)
| Matt Ewin
| Submission (toe hold)
| Extreme Brawl 1
| 
| align=center| 2
| align=center| N/A
| Bracknell, England
| 
|-
| NC
| align=center| 3–0 (1)
| Jean Silva
| NC (cage malfunction)
| Millennium Brawl 8
| 
| align=center| 3
| align=center| N/A
| High Wycombe, England
| 
|-
| Win
| align=center| 3–0
| Mark Singleton
| KO (punch)
| Yorkshire Fight Night
| 
| align=center| 1
| align=center| 2:00
| Yorkshire, England
| 
|-
| Win
| align=center| 2–0
| Kieron McEntee
| Submission (rear-naked choke)
| Ultimate Fight Night
| 
| align=center| N/A
| align=center| N/A
| High Wycombe, England
| 
|-
| Win
| align=center| 1–0
| Rosaire Letapin
| Decision (unanimous)
| Pancrase: Pancrase UK
| 
| align=center| N/A
| align=center| N/A
| High Wycombe, England
|

Kickboxing record

| Loss
|align=center| 3–1
|  Rodney Moore
| Decision (unanimous)
| AKUMA MMA
| 
|align=center| 3
|align=center| 3:00
|Belfast, Northern Ireland
| 
|-
| Win
|align=center| 3–0
|  Jack Mason
| Decision (unanimous)
| UCMMA 7 - Mayhem
| 
|align=center| 3
|align=center| 3:00
|London, England
| 
|-
| Win
|align=center| 2–0
|  Jake Bostwick
| KO (right knee)
| UCMMA 5 - Heat
| 
|align=center| 1
|align=center| 1:55
|London, England
| 
|-
| Win
|align=center| 1–0
|  John Maguire
| Decision (unanimous)
| UCMMA 2 - Unbreakable
| 
|align=center| 3
|align=center| 3:00
|London, England
|

See also
 List of male mixed martial artists

References

External links

Official website

1975 births
20th-century English male actors
21st-century English male actors
Male actors from Hampshire
Alumni of the Guildford School of Acting
Reality show winners
Cruiserweight kickboxers
English male film actors
English male kickboxers
English male mixed martial artists
English male television actors
Katie Price
Living people
Middleweight mixed martial artists
Sportspeople from Aldershot
People educated at Alderwood School
Actors from Aldershot